Targa Canada West is a tarmac-based rally race in British Columbia, Canada.  

It takes place on closed public roads in host communities, and historically stems from the popular Targa Florio and later the Mille Miglia.

Cars compete against the clock on paved roads: the cars start at 30 second intervals on 'special' or 'competition stages' of 10 to 25 km each (these roads are safely and temporarily closed to the public). In between competition stages, the vehicles 'transit' on public roads and conform to regular road rules.

The events are open to street-legal sports cars of all makes, models and vintages – with some exceptions (e.g. convertibles require a hard top and roll bar).

Regular street-legal cars can enter in Class 1 & 2 – after which additional safety equipment is required (roll cage, etc.) in higher speed classes 3 to 6. 

Targa Canada West's inaugural event is to be determined via talks with host communities: 'though target is 2011 or 2012. A two- to three-day event to take place in the Southern Interior of BC, Canada

Targa Canada West plans a full five- or six-day Targa event in subsequent years, similar to the week-long events in Newfoundland, Tasmania and New Zealand.

List of past winners

Open Competition

Touring Competition

Other Targa competitions
 Targa Tasmania - Australia
 Targa New Zealand - New Zealand
 Targa Florio - Italy
 Targa Wrest Point - Australia (TAS)
 Targa West - Australia (WA)
 Targa Newfoundland - Canada

References

 http://www.targatasmania.com.au/

External links
 Targa Canada West official website
 Targa Tasmania official website
 Targa NZ official website
 Targa Newfoundland official website

Rally competitions in Canada